Ken Gray may refer to:

 Ken Gray (American football) (1936–2017), American football offensive guard
 Ken Gray (athlete) (born 1962), Jamaican Olympic hurdler
 Ken Gray (rugby union) (1938–1992), New Zealand rugby player

See also
 Kenneth J. Gray (1924–2014), U.S. Representative from Illinois